Conops vesicularis is a species of fly from the genus Conops in the family Conopidae. Their larvae are endoparasites of bees and wasps.

References 

Parasitic flies
Conopidae
Insects described in 1761
Muscomorph flies of Europe
Articles containing video clips
Taxa named by Carl Linnaeus
Endoparasites